Wanderlust is an Australian contemporary jazz band led by trumpeter Miroslav Bukovsky that formed in 1991. The original lineup comprised Miroslav Bukovsky, James Greening (trombone), Carl Orr (guitar), Alister Spence (piano, keyboards), Adam Armstrong (bass) and Fabian Hevia (drums, percussion).

In 1994, their self-titled album won the ARIA Award for Best Jazz Album. Since then they have released four albums: Border Crossing, Song and Dance, Full Bronte and When In Rome.

3 Oct 1992 played at Manly Jazz Festival  inside Park Royal Hotel. Audiocassette in NSW Jazz Archive collection[per estate of late Harold Denning] held in archives of this Society;leader Neil Cairns, June 2013.

References

Australian jazz ensembles